Patryk Szwedzik (born 2 December 2001) is a Polish professional footballer who plays as a forward for Polish club Śląsk Wrocław.

Career statistics

Club

References

External links

2001 births
Living people
People from Legnica
Association football forwards
Polish footballers
Poland youth international footballers
GKS Katowice players
Śląsk Wrocław players
II liga players
I liga players